Datuk Punch Gunalan  (4 February 1944 – 15 August 2012) was a Malaysian badminton player, who achieved success in both singles and doubles competitions.

Badminton career
Gunalan was a talented right-hander who spent what might have been some of the best years of his playing career competing only sporadically as a student in England.

In early 70s, Gunalan and his partner, Ng Boon Bee became the leading men's doubles team in the world. They captured gold at the biennial Asian Games (1970), at the quadrennial Commonwealth Games (1970), and at the Asian Championships (1969). They captured the venerable All England title in 1971.

Though perhaps less consistent in singles than he was in doubles, Gunalan was capable of playing it at the highest level. He reached the All-England singles final in 1974, losing in three close sets to the iconic Rudy Hartono. He also helped Malaysia reach the Thomas Cup final in 1970. He is the only Malaysian to capture gold medals in both men's singles and men's doubles at the Sea Games, the Commonwealth Games, and the Asian Games.

Post-retirement
After retiring as a player in 1974 Gunalan served in various stints as coach of the Malaysian team, an official in the Malaysian Badminton Association and as an official in the International Badminton Federation (now Badminton World Federation). In 1992, as team manager of the Thomas Cup together with Badminton Association of Malaysia (BAM) president Tan Sri Elyas Omar, Malaysia won the Thomas Cup beating Indonesia.

Death
Gunalan died on 15 August 2012 after suffering from a critical illness. He was 68.

Honours

Honours of Malaysia 
  :
  Herald of the Order of Loyalty to the Royal Family of Malaysia (B.S.D.) (1988)
  Commander of the Order of Loyalty to the Royal Family of Malaysia (P.S.D.) - Datuk (1992)

Achievements

Olympic Games (demonstration) 
Men's doubles

Asian Games 

Men's singles

Men's doubles

Asian Championships 

Men's singles

Men's doubles

Southeast Asian Peninsular Games 
Men's doubles

Men's singles

Mixed doubles

Commonwealth Games 
Men's doubles

Men's singles

International tournaments 
Men's doubles

Men's singles

References

Malaysian male badminton players
1944 births
2012 deaths
Malaysian people of Tamil descent
Malaysian sportspeople of Indian descent
People from Selangor
Olympic badminton players of Malaysia
Badminton players at the 1972 Summer Olympics
Asian Games medalists in badminton
Asian Games gold medalists for Malaysia
Asian Games bronze medalists for Malaysia
Badminton players at the 1970 Asian Games
Badminton players at the 1970 British Commonwealth Games
Badminton players at the 1974 British Commonwealth Games
Commonwealth Games medallists in badminton
Commonwealth Games gold medallists for Malaysia
Commonwealth Games bronze medallists for Malaysia
Medalists at the 1970 Asian Games
Southeast Asian Games medalists in badminton
Southeast Asian Games gold medalists for Malaysia
Commanders of the Order of Loyalty to the Royal Family of Malaysia
Competitors at the 1969 Southeast Asian Peninsular Games
Competitors at the 1971 Southeast Asian Peninsular Games
Competitors at the 1973 Southeast Asian Peninsular Games
Heralds of the Order of Loyalty to the Royal Family of Malaysia
Medallists at the 1970 British Commonwealth Games
Medallists at the 1974 British Commonwealth Games